Demanding the Impossible is a book on the history of anarchism by Peter Marshall.

References

External links 

 

1992 non-fiction books
History books about anarchism
HarperCollins books
PM Press books